200 Halla Ho is a 2021 Indian Hindi-language crime thriller film directed by Sarthak Dasgupta and Alok Batra (in his directorial debut) with production by Yoodlee films. The film is based on the real life incident in which 200 women lynched Akku Yadav, a gangster, robber, serial rapist, and killer in an open court in Nagpur in 2004. It was digitally released on 20 August 2021 on ZEE5.

Cast 
 Amol Palekar as Justice Vitthal Daangle
 Barun Sobti as Umesh Joshi
 Ishtiyak Khan as Prof. Avsare
 Sahil Khattar as Bali Choudhary
 Upendra Limaye as Suresh Patil
 Rinku Rajguru as Asha Surve
 Flora Saini as Poornima
 Indraneil Sengupta as IPS, Sameer Deshpande
 Pradhuman Singh as Anwar Sheikh
 Saloni Batra as Purva
 Apurva Choudhari as Jyoti
 Sushama Deshpande as Tarabai Kamble
 Vinay Hake as the Reporter
 Punit Tiwari as Santosh
 Sahana Vasudevan as Neha

Reception 
Arushi Jain of The Indian Express gave the film a mixed review and stated, "Though a torpid screenplay fails the subject of the movie, veteran actor Amol Palekar stays committed to the character of a retired Dalit judge. He brings some profundity to a film that lacks depth." Archika Khurana of The Times of India gave the film 3 out of 5 stars and stated, "If you like non-fiction films based on true stories, this drama definitely deserves a watch in order to comprehend the grief and suffering that those women must have endured." R.M. Vijayakar of India West gave the film a mixed review and stated, "This film may not be a must-watch in the way it is made, but it is certainly not a waste of resources and audience time like Yoodlee’s social thriller past excesses." Mumbai Live gave the film a mixed review and stated, "The movie leaves a lasting impact on your mind and one wonders that no matter how much we talk about equality, there are certain sects that are still struggling to get the respect they deserve." Shantanu Ray Chaudhuri of The Free Press Journal gave the film 3 out of 5 stars and stated, "If only it did not wear its activism, its social agenda, on its sleeves, it would have been more than the polemic tract it often feels like."

Saibal Chatterjee of NDTV gave the film 3.5 out of 5 stars and stated, "Drawing strength from a slew of quietly efficient performances, the director parlays the material into an impactful tale of crime and punishment that transcends genre limitations." News 18 praised its "decent" production values, tone, pacing, "powerful" performances and "dramatic" direction.

References

External links 
 200 Halla Ho at ZEE5
 

2021 films
2021 crime thriller films
Indian crime thriller films
2020s Hindi-language films